Cacciatore  is an Italian dish.

Cacciatore may also refer to:

 Cacciatore (surname), an Italian surname
 Benedetto Santapaola (born 1938), mafioso from Catania, nicknamed il cacciatore
 Cacciatore Stadium, DePaul University, Chicago, Illinois, USA
 Cacciatore: The Hunter (2018 TV series), an Italian TV show, also called Il Cacciatore, Cacciatore, The Hunter

See also

 Cacciatori (surname)
 
 Hunter (disambiguation)
 Huntress (disambiguation)
 Huntsman (disambiguation)